Franko is a given name and a surname. Notable people with the name include:

Given name
 Franko (bishop of Poznań), 11th-century Polish bishop
 Franko Andrijašević (born 1991), Croatian footballer
 Franko B, Franko Bosisio (born 1960), Italian performance artist
 Franko Bogdan (born 1965), Croatian footballer
 Franko Božac (born 1974), Croatian accordionist
 Franko Burraj (born 1998), Albanian sprinter
 Franko Bushati (born 1985), Albanian basketball player
 Franko Grgić (born 2003), Croatian swimmer
 Franko Kaštropil (born 1984), Croatian basketball player
 Franko Kovačević (born 1999), Croatian footballer
 Franko Luin (1941–2005), Italian-born Swedish type designer of Slovene origin
 Franko Nakić (born 1972), Croatian-born Greek basketball player
 Franko Paul (born 1995), Indian footballer
 Franko Šango (born 1992), Croatian basketball player
 Franko Simatović (born 1950), Serbian intelligence officer of Croatian descent
 Franko Škugor (born 1987), Croatian tennis player
 Franko Uzelac (born 1994), Croatian footballer

Nickname or pseudonym
 Franko Fraize, British rapper
 Franko House (born 1994), American basketball player

Surname
 Ivan Franko (1856–1916), Ukrainian writer and political activist
 Jure Franko (born 1962), Slovenian-Yugoslav alpine skier
 Mariana Franko (died after 1777), free colored in Curaçao in the Dutch West Indies
 Martina Franko (born 1976), Canadian soccer player
 Matej Franko (born 2001), Slovak footballer
 Nahan Franko (1861–1930), American violinist, conductor, and concert promoter
 Petro Franko (1890–1941), Ukrainian educator, military leader, and politician
 Sam Franko (1857–1937), American violinist and conductor

See also
Franco (name)

Croatian masculine given names